Yücekapı is a town (belde) and municipality in the Eleşkirt District, Ağrı Province, Turkey. Its population is 2,200 (2021).

References

Populated places in Ağrı Province
Towns in Turkey